Ignashino is a rural locality (a selo) in Rabochy Posyolok Erofey Pavlovich of Skovorodinsky District, Amur Oblast, Russia. The population was 179 as of 2018. There are 7 streets.

Geography 
Ignashino is located 230 km southwest of Skovorodino (the district's administrative centre) by road. Yerofey Pavlovich is the nearest rural locality.

References 

Rural localities in Skovorodinsky District